The Team normal hill/4 × 5 km competition at the FIS Nordic World Ski Championships 2019 was held on 2 March 2019.

Results

Ski jumping
The ski jumping part was started at 11:00.

Cross-country skiing
The cross-country skiing part was started at 14:45.

References

Team normal hill/4 × 5 km